The term subgraph can refer to:

The security-focused Linux-based Subgraph operating system, see Subgraph (operating system)
Subgraph of a function, see Hypograph (mathematics)
In graph theory, see Glossary of graph theory#subgraph